Hill Complex Historic District is a national historic district located at Sharon, York County, South Carolina. It encompasses four contributing buildings in Sharon. The buildings are commercial, industrial, and residential buildings built by William Lawrence Hill between about 1890 and 1925. The buildings are the William L. Hill House (c. 1890), W. L. Hill Cotton Gin (c. 1925), W. L. Hill Cotton Warehouse and Dock (c. 1920), and the separately listed W.L. Hill Store (1913).

It was added to the National Register of Historic Places in 2003.

References

Historic districts on the National Register of Historic Places in South Carolina
Buildings and structures in York County, South Carolina
National Register of Historic Places in York County, South Carolina